Trudy Grant, President of Sullivan Entertainment International and COO of the Sullivan Entertainment Group, has been part of the establishment of the Canadian entertainment industry for nearly thirty years. Grant, who is married to Kevin Sullivan, has won numerous awards for her work in television and film.

Grant has been instrumental in making Sullivan Entertainment International a major exporter of Canadian and international media content around the world, with an inventory of movies and programming from all genres, including miniseries, feature films, family and children's drama, and documentaries.

Filmography
Executive Producer
Anne of Green Gables: A New Beginning (2008)
Magic Flute Diaries (2008)
Anne: Journey to Green Gables (animated film, 2005)
The Piano Man’s Daughter (film, 2003)
A Wind at My Back Christmas (film, 2001)
P.R. Operation Overload (film, 2001)
P.R. (television series, 2001)
Wind at My Back (1996–2001)
Anne of Green Gables: The Continuing Story (2000)
Anne of Green Gables: The Animated Series (television series, 2000)
Seasons of Love (film, 1999)
An Avonlea Christmas (aka. Happy Christmas Miss King) (film, 1998)
Promise the Moon (film, 1997)
Sleeping Dogs Lie (film, 1998)
Road to Avonlea (1989–1996)
Butterbox Babies (film, 1995)
Under the Piano (film, 1995)
By Way of the Stars (film, 1992)
Lantern Hill (film, 1990)
Looking for Miracles (film, 1989)
Anne of Green Gables: The Sequel (1987)
Anne of Green Gables (1985)

List of Awards 

George Foster Peabody Award
3 Emmy Awards
6 Emmy Award Nominations
5 Gemini Awards
8 Gemini Award Nominations
3 CableACE Awards
2 CableAce Nominations
Prix Jeunesse
TV Guide Parent's Choice Award
American TV Critics Award
3 Golden Apple Awards from the National Educational Media Competition
1 Ollie Award
European Jury Prize at the Umbriafiction TV Festival
Gold World Medal – New York Film Festival
Golden Gate Award
Gold Medal – New York International Film and Television Festival
ACT Award
Best Children's Production – Television Movie Awards

References

External links
 Official website
 

Living people
Year of birth missing (living people)
Canadian film producers
Canadian television producers
Place of birth missing (living people)
Canadian women television producers
Canadian women film producers